Hastomo Arbi (born Ang Tjong Hauw, 5 August 1958, in Kudus, Central Java) is a retired male Chinese Indonesian badminton player who represented Indonesia.

Career 
He was active as an international level player from the late 1970s to the mid-1980s. He is the older brother of Hariyanto Arbi, an Indonesian player of the 1990s who won men's singles at the 1995 IBF World Championships and Eddy Hartono who was a silver men's doubles medalist at the 1992 Summer Olympics.

Arbi, who developed his game at PB Djarum, is best remembered for helping Indonesia regain the Thomas Cup (men's world team championship) from China in 1984 by upsetting China's Han Jian in the second singles match. In 1979 he won men's singles at the Southeast Asian Games. In 2015, the 26th, in the category 55 years, he is the world champion in the world senior championship at Helsinborg in Sweden.

Achievements

World Cup 
Men's singles

World Senior Championships 

Men's singles

Southeast Asian Games 
Men's singles

IBF World Grand Prix (4 runners-up) 
The World Badminton Grand Prix sanctioned by International Badminton Federation (IBF) from 1983 to 2006.

Men's singles

 IBF Grand Prix tournament
 IBF Grand Prix Finals tournament

References
Profile
Sabaruddin Sa: Apa & siapa sejumlah orang bulutangkis Indonesia, Jurnalindo Aksara Grafika 1994, 
Sam Setyautama: Tokoh-tokoh etnis Tionghoa di Indonesia, 2008, 

Indonesian male badminton players
1958 births
Living people
Indonesian people of Chinese descent
Southeast Asian Games gold medalists for Indonesia
Southeast Asian Games medalists in badminton
Competitors at the 1979 Southeast Asian Games
People from Kudus Regency
Sportspeople from Central Java